The 1959 Big Ten Conference football season was the 64th season of college football played by the member schools of the Big Ten Conference and was a part of the 1959 NCAA University Division football season.

The 1959 Wisconsin Badgers football team, under head coach Milt Bruhn, won the Big Ten championship, was ranked No. 6 in the final AP Poll, and lost to Washington in the 1960 Rose Bowl. Tackle Dan Lanphear was a consensus first-team All-American.  Quarterback Dale Hackbart led the Big Ten with 1,121 yards of total offense.

Season overview

Results and team statistics

Key
AP final = Team's rank in the final AP Poll of the 1959 season
AP high = Team's highest rank in the AP Poll throughout the 1959 season
PPG = Average of points scored per game
PAG = Average of points allowed per game
MVP = Most valuable player as voted by players on each team as part of the voting process to determine the winner of the Chicago Tribune Silver Football trophy; trophy winner in bold

Preseason
On November 14, 1958, Bennie Oosterbaan resigned as Michigan's head football coach with two games remaining in the program's worst season since 1936. Bump Elliott, who had been Michigan's backfield coach for two years, was hired to replace him.

Regular season

Bowl games

Post-season developments
Shortly before the end of the 1959 season, Illinois head coach Ray Eliot retired after 18 years in the position. On December 22, 1959, Illinois hired 33-year-old Pete Elliott as its new head football coach. Elliott had played for Michigan and served as California's head coach from 1957 to 1959.

Statistical leaders

The Big Ten's individual statistical leaders for the 1959 season include the following:

Passing yards

Rushing yards

Receiving yards

Total yards

Scoring

Awards and honors

All-Big Ten honors

The following players were picked by the Associated Press (AP) and/or the United Press International (UPI) as first-team players on the 1959 All-Big Ten Conference football team.

All-American honors

At the end of the 1959 season, Big Ten players secured three of the 11 consensus first-team picks on the 1959 College Football All-America Team. The Big Ten's consensus All-Americans were:

Other Big Ten players who were named first-team All-Americans by at least one selector were:

Other awards

Four Big Ten players finished among the top 10 in the voting for the 1959 Heisman Trophy: offensive lineman Bill Burrell of Illinois (fourth); running back Dean Look of Michigan State (sixth); quarterback Dale Hackbart of Wisconsin (seventh); and running back Ron Burton of Wisconsin (10th).

1960 NFL Draft
The following Big Ten players were among the first 100 picks in the 1960 NFL Draft:

References